Flawless Sabrina (September 10, 1939 – November 18, 2017), also known as Mother Flawless Sabrina, was an American LGBT activist, drag queen, performer, and actress, based in New York City. Flawless Sabrina was a pioneer for transgender people and drag queens not only in the mainstream, heterosexual society, but within the gay society as well, where transgender people remained heavily stigmatized. Sabrina lived in New York near Central Park from the 1960s until her death.

Early life 

Born Jack Doroshow in South Philadelphia, in a family of mixed Jewish and Italian heritage, Sabrina was a pioneer in the transgender and gay communities in the 1960s in New York. In the 1960s, New York drag queens were very stigmatised, not only by the mainstream society, but even within the gay community as well. Sabrina was one of the first widely known drag queens in the United States. She became widely known partially for organizing various drag queen pageants all over the U.S. such as The Nationals, Miss Philadelphia or the Miss Nationals, which was sponsored by Sabrina Enterprises.

Career
The documentary The Queen captures the 1967 Miss All-America Camp Beauty Contest in New York City; Sabrina served as emcee to the competition. The film was selected to screen during International Critics' Week at the 1968 Cannes Film Festival, which was curtailed before any awards could be given out, due to ongoing civil unrest in France.  Sabrina was subsequently arrested three times in 1968 promoting The Queen in Times Square.

While filming the documentary Sabrina took on the moniker of "Mother" to assure other participants in the pageant that she was not part of the competition. Very soon, what was a joke became a very personal title, and she became a mentor to numerous other transgender people living in New York City at the time.

The success of The Queen resulted in Sabrina accepting numerous invitations to speak on talk shows and make television appearances in drag. These broadcasts caused discomfort not only with the heterosexual and conservative public, but the gay public as well.  A poster of Sabrina in The Queen has a brief cameo in Pink Flamingos (1972), a film by John Waters. 

Despite Sabrina's confidence with herself in drag on television and other engagements, she remained somewhat mysterious within the gay community, as recounted by Thom Nickels, author of Gay and Lesbian in Philadelphia. Though she was not a huge part of the Center City night life, she hosted several decadent and grandiose mansion parties.

In 2008 Flawless Sabrina appeared in La JohnJoseph's theatrical production Notorious Beauty in New York City. Sabrina played a drug-induced vision of a thin, ghostly, violin player in Dorian, a 2009 four-channel video installation by Michelle Handelman. Sabrina was also featured in Handelman's 2014 multichannel video installation Irma Vep, The Last Breath, influenced by Musidora, known for playing Irma Vep in the 1915 film Les Vampires.

Death and legacy
Sabrina died on November 18, 2017, at the age of 78.

Sabrina was also a mentor for Ceyenne Doroshow, now an author, public speaker and advocate for homeless youth. They met at a midtown Manhattan club called Bentley's, and Sabrina helped her get control of her life, while she was a homeless teenager.

In 2014, a Kickstarter crowdfunding fundraiser raised $20,000.00 to create an archive of her work for easy access and study, called the "Flawless Sabrina Archive". The fundraiser was founded by Zackary Drucker and Diana Tourjee, two of Sabrina's mentees. The archive was created as a thank-you to Sabrina for being inspirational to queer youth, as well as a way of raising money to protect her when she was almost evicted from her New York City apartment. The owner of the building had died, and once the ownership was returned to the bank they wished to increase the rent, or evict her. The archive money now funds a storage space where Tourjee archives Sabrina's possessions as they move them in. Sabrina's mentees also state, as part of their reason for the creation of the Flawless Sabrina Archives, that Sabrina has been and continues to be an influential part of the transgender community.

Filmography

See also 

 LGBT culture in Philadelphia
 LGBTQ culture in New York City
 List of LGBT actions in the United States prior to the Stonewall riots

References

External links
 

1939 births
2017 deaths
American drag queens
20th-century American Jews
American people of Italian descent
LGBT people from Pennsylvania
American LGBT rights activists
People from Manhattan
People from Philadelphia
21st-century American Jews